FC Hasental is an American soccer team based in Thousand Oaks, California, United States. Founded in 2005, the team plays in the Southwest Division of the National Premier Soccer League (NPSL), the fourth tier of the American Soccer Pyramid.

The team plays its home games in various stadiums in the Conejo and Simi Valleys.  The team's colors are orange, light blue and white.

FC Hasental also has youth teams. FC Hasental (Youth) started in the year 2012.

History
FC Hasental was established in 2005, as an amateur club, based in the Conejo Valley of Southern California. The founders agreed on the name "Football Club Hasental" in honor of their European roots. Hasental translates from German to English as Hare-Valley, also known as Conejo Valley. FC Hasental was founded by Gerd Kleemann, Eric Warner, Justin Carpenter, and Robbert-Jan Matthee.

FC Hasental began playing in the USASA-affiliated La Gran Liga de Oxnard in 2005/06, where they lost to Royal Puma FC in the Semi Finals. The following year they finished the season in second position, losing in the first round of the playoffs to CFA United. In the 2007/08 season Hasental entered the Tri-County Soccer League (TCSL) , where they won the league cup with a 5-1 Victory over CSC76 Wanderers (Rovers). The following season Hasental introduced their reserve team, who won the TCSL League Championship, beating cup holders Crown & Anchor Lions with a 1–1 draw in May 2009.

FC Hasental's reserve team won the TCSL Charity Shield in 2009/10, but relinquished their hold of the League Cup. The club entered the Lamar Hunt US Open Cup in 2009 and 2010, through the Region IV USASA qualification tournament, but failed to qualify on both occasions.

Also in 2010, Hasental enjoyed victories over Hollywood United, Orange County Blue Star, Los Angeles Blues and PSA Elite, and tied 1–1 with Major League Soccer side Chivas USA, while the Hasental U23's lost 5–0 to the same Chivas USA team, and lost to the Maryland Bays in the U23 National Championship semi finals, in Overland Park, Kansas.

Players
 فيصل عبدالجواد🇸🇦⁩

Notable former players

Year-by-year

Head coaches
  Eric Warner Bergman (2011–present)

Stadia
 Stadium at Calabasas High School; Calabasas, California (2011)
 Stadium at Oxnard College; Oxnard, California (2011) 1 game
 Rancho Santa Susana Community Park; Simi Valley, California (2012)
 Lancer Stadium at Thousand Oaks High School; Thousand Oaks, California (2014)
 Rancho Madera Community Park; Simi Valley, California (2015)
 Eagle Stadium at Oak Park High School; Oak Park, California (2013-)
 William Rolland Stadium at California Lutheran University; Thousand Oaks, California (2012-2013, 2016-)
 Mt Clef Stadium at California Lutheran University; Thousand Oaks, California (2013,2016-)

Average attendance
Attendance stats are calculated by averaging each team's self-reported home attendances from the historical match archive at https://web.archive.org/web/20100105175057/http://www.uslsoccer.com/history/index_E.html.

 2011: to be announced

References

External links
 Official site

Association football clubs established in 2005
National Premier Soccer League teams
2005 establishments in California